Nélson Alexandre da Silva Veríssimo (born 17 April 1977) is a Portuguese former footballer who played as a central defender, currently a manager.

Formed at Benfica, he totalled 221 Primeira Liga games with that team, Académica de Coimbra, Alverca and Vitória de Setúbal (Taça de Portugal winner in 2005), as well as 149 in the second division for Alverca and Fátima. He earned 36 caps for Portugal up to under-21 and B-team level.

As a manager, Veríssimo held several roles at Benfica, including twice being caretaker manager of the first team, and two spells in charge of the reserves. He also led Estoril in the top flight.

Playing career
Veríssimo was born in Vila Franca de Xira, Lisbon District. During his professional career, the youth graduate at S.L. Benfica (having joined the club's youth system at the age of 12, he only appeared in four first-team games during his short spell) represented F.C. Alverca – the first of his spells being while they acted as the former's farm team– Académica de Coimbra, Vitória de Setúbal, C.D. Fátima and C.D. Mafra.

Signed for Fátima by Rui Vitória, Veríssimo's four seasons at the Estádio João Paulo II involved their only three seasons in the Segunda Liga; their only national title, the 2008–09 Segunda Divisão won against Leonardo Jardim's G.D. Chaves; as well as a run to the fourth round of the Taça da Liga in 2007–08 via a penalty shootout win over FC Porto.

Coaching career
Veríssimo rejoined Benfica immediately after retiring, being appointed assistant coach with the reserves in the second division, first under Luís Norton de Matos, then former teammate at the club Hélder Cristóvão. In January 2019, as Bruno Lage was named caretaker manager at the main squad, he assumed the same position in the secondary team; he returned to the latter's technical staff shortly after, now permanently in charge of the main squad.

When Lage resigned in July 2020, after Benfica fell into second place behind FC Porto in the closing stages of the season, Veríssimo took interim charge of the first team; he won 3–1 at home to Boavista F.C. on his debut.

After the appointment of Jorge Jesus as manager of the first team, Veríssimo was named manager of the reserves, replacing Renato Paiva. In December 2021, after Jesus was sacked, he was again named interim of the main squad, leaving Benfica B as leader of the Portuguese second league. He led the team into the Final of the Taça da Liga, losing 2–1 against Sporting CP. Benfica remained trophyless, and Veríssimo guided the club to the Champions League quarter-finals, losing to Liverpool 6–4 on aggregate and a disappointing third place finish, qualifying to the third qualifying round of the UEFA Champions League.

After leaving Benfica at the end of the season, Veríssimo was announced as the new manager of G.D. Estoril Praia on 2 July 2022, replacing Bruno Pinheiro. He was dismissed the following 24 February with the team 15th after 21 games, albeit seven points outside the relegation play-off place.

Managerial statistics

Honours
Vitória Setúbal
Taça de Portugal: 2004–05

Fátima
Portuguese Second Division: 2008–09

References

External links

1977 births
Living people
People from Vila Franca de Xira
Sportspeople from Lisbon District
Portuguese footballers
Association football defenders
Primeira Liga players
Liga Portugal 2 players
Segunda Divisão players
S.L. Benfica footballers
F.C. Alverca players
Associação Académica de Coimbra – O.A.F. players
Vitória F.C. players
C.D. Fátima players
C.D. Mafra players
Portugal youth international footballers
Portugal under-21 international footballers
Portuguese football managers
Primeira Liga managers
Liga Portugal 2 managers
S.L. Benfica B managers
S.L. Benfica managers
G.D. Estoril Praia managers
Association football coaches
S.L. Benfica non-playing staff